The Mehaigne is a river in Belgium. It is a left tributary to the Meuse.

The Mehaigne flows in a roughly eastern direction through a region called Hesbaye.

Rivers of Belgium
Rivers of Namur (province)
Rivers of Limburg (Belgium)
Rivers of Liège Province